Frank Alan Cottle (21 December 1920 – 17 February 1992) was an Australian rugby league player who played in the 1940s and 1950s.

Playing career
A Norths junior from the Cremorne club, Cottle played nine seasons with North Sydney between 1940-1951. 

War service saw Cottle miss the 1943, 1944 and 1945 seasons. He later went on to captain North Sydney and was a popular clubman during his time at the club.

Cottle was also selected to play for New South Wales on three occasions during 1947, and also represented City Firsts between 1947-1948.

Cottle died on 17 February 1992, aged 71.

References

North Sydney Bears players
New South Wales rugby league team players
Australian rugby league players
1920 births
1992 deaths
Australian Army personnel of World War II
Rugby league centres
Australian Army soldiers
Royal Australian Air Force personnel of World War II
Royal Australian Air Force airmen